For another meaning of EDAC, see error detection and correction

The El Dorado Arts Council (EDAC) is the official El Dorado County, California, USA arts council.

The El Dorado Arts Council supports the cultural development of El Dorado County by advocating for and creating the highest quality artistic and educational opportunities for residents and visitors. It serves as the county's umbrella organization for individual artists and arts organizations, providing them with a variety of programs and services.

The El Dorado Arts Council is funded in part by the California Arts Council, as well as through grants, memberships, donations and fundraising events.

The El Dorado Arts Council runs under the California state arts council, the California Arts Council (CAC).

External links
El Dorado Arts Council website

Arts councils of California
El Dorado County, California